Parakinetica is a monotypic genus of brachiopods belonging to the family Terebratellidae. The only species is Parakinetica stewartii.

The species is found in Southern Australia.

References

Terebratulida
Brachiopod genera
Monotypic brachiopod genera